The following lists events that happened during 1936 in the Union of Soviet Socialist Republics.

Incumbents
 General Secretary of the Communist Party of the Soviet Union – Joseph Stalin
 Chairman of the Central Executive Committee of the Congress of Soviets – Mikhail Kalinin
 Chairman of the Council of People's Commissars of the Soviet Union – Vyacheslav Molotov

Events
 August 19–24 – Trial of the Sixteen

Undated
 Stalin's Great Purges begin.
 Second Five-Year Plan underway

Films
 By the Bluest of Seas – directed by Boris Barnet
 Circus – directed by Grigori Aleksandrov
 Girl Friends – directed by Lev Arnshtam

Publications

Births
28 January - Bernara Karieva, Uzbekistani ballerina
2 June - Volodymyr Holubnychy, Ukrainian Olympic athlete (d. 2021)
7 July - Anatoly Kirov, Russian wrestler
1 September - Valery Legasov, Russian chemist (d. 1988)
21 September - Yury Luzhkov, mayor of Moscow (d. 2019)
8 October - Leonid Kuravlyov, Russian actor (d. 2022)
30 October - Polina Astakhova, Ukrainian gymnast (d. 2005)

Deaths
 August 22 – Mikhail Tomsky
 August 25 – Lev Kamenev, Grigory Zinoviev and Ivan Nikitich Smirnov

References

See also
 1936 in fine arts of the Soviet Union
 History of the Soviet Union (1927–1953)
 List of Soviet films of 1936
 Purges
 Soviet Union

 
1930s in the Soviet Union